Qaleh Bozorg (also Romanized as Qal‘eh Bozorg; also known as Qalāt'', 'Qal‘eh, Qal’eh Kūchek, and Qal‘eh-ye Kūchek''') is a village in Marhemetabad-e Jonubi Rural District, in the Central District of Miandoab County, West Azerbaijan Province, Iran. At the 2006 census, its population was 289 people, in 66 families.

References 

Populated places in Miandoab County